DBNPA or 2,2-dibromo-3-nitrilopropionamide is a quick-kill biocide that easily hydrolyzes under both acidic and alkaline conditions. It is preferred for its instability in water as it quickly kills and then quickly degrades to form a number of products, depending on the conditions, including ammonia, bromide ions, dibromoacetonitrile, and dibromoacetic acid. DBNPA acts similar to the typical halogen biocides.

DBNPA is used in a wide variety of applications.  Some examples are in papermaking as a preservative in paper coating and slurries. It is also used as slime control on papermachines, and as a biocide in hydraulic fracturing wells and in cooling water.

References

Antimicrobials
Organobromides
Acetamides
Nitriles